is a three-member Japanese band, formed in 1998 in Shimokitazawa.

Discography

Studio albums 
 Spangle call Lilli line (March 25, 2001)
 Nanae (November 10, 2002)
 or (June 11, 2003)
 TRACE (April 20, 2005)
 ISOLATION (September 24, 2008)
 PURPLE (November 12, 2008)
 VIEW (April 21, 2010)
 forest at the head of a river (June 23, 2010)
 New Season (September 7, 2011)
 ghost is dead (November 11, 2015)
 Dreams Never End (January 9, 2019)
 Remember (March 3, 2021)

Singles 
 "nano" (April 9, 2003)
 "dreamer" (March 17, 2010)
 "mio" (December 19, 2018)
 "lean forward" (June 17, 2022)

Extended plays 
 WS (with Windy Hill) (July 20, 2001)
 FOR INSTALLATION (June 29, 2005)

Live albums 
 68 SCLL (March 17, 2004)
 SCLL LIVE (DVD) (August 5, 2009)

Compilations 
 SINCE (album) (October 25, 2006)
 SINCE2 (album) (June 12, 2013)

Japanese rock music groups
Musical groups from Setagaya